Andhra Pradesh does not recognise same-sex marriages or civil unions.

Legal history

Background
Marriage in India is governed under several federal laws. These laws allow for the solemnisation of marriages according to different religions. Every citizen has the right to choose which law will apply to them based on their community or religion. These laws are the Hindu Marriage Act, 1955 (HMA), which governs matters of marriage, separation and divorce for Hindus according to Hindu custom and rites, the Indian Christian Marriage Act, 1872, which regulates the marriage and divorce of Christians, the Muslim Personal Law (Shariat) Application Act, 1937, for matters concerning the marriage, succession and inheritance of Muslims, the Parsi Marriage and Divorce Act, 1936, concerning the marriage and divorce of Parsis, the Anand Marriage Act, 1909, concerning the marriage of Sikhs, and the Special Marriage Act, 1954 (SMA). The SMA allows all Indian citizens to marry regardless of the religion of either party. Marriages contracted under the SMA are registered with the state as a civil contract. The Act applies to partners of all religions or with no religious beliefs as well as to interfaith couples. None of these acts explicitly bans same-sex marriage.

On 14 February 2006, the Supreme Court of India ruled in Smt. Seema v. Ashwani Kumar that the states and union territories are obliged to register all marriages performed under the federal laws. The court's ruling was expected to reduce instances of child marriages, bigamy, cases of domestic violence and unlawful abandonment. Andhra Pradesh had already passed legislation requiring the registration of all marriages performed in the state. The Andhra Pradesh Legislature (which consists of the Legislative Council and the Legislative Assembly) passed the Andhra Pradesh Compulsory Registration of Marriages Act, 2002, which was later signed into law by Governor C. Rangarajan. It created a Registrar of Marriages for every district, which shall issue a marriage certificate upon reception of a memorandum of marriage filed by the spouses. The Registrar may refuse to issue the license if the parties fail to meet the requirements to marry under the national law of their religion or community. The Act defines marriage as "all marriages performed by persons belonging to any caste or religion and also the marriages performed as per any custom, practices or any traditions including the marriages performed in the tribal areas and the word 'marriage' also includes 'remarriage'". The Act generally refers to married spouses as "bride and bridegroom".

Non-legally recognised marriage ceremonies
On 18 December 2021, two men, Supriyo Chakraborty and Abhay Dang, were married in a Hindu ceremony in Hyderabad, the de jure capital of Andhra Pradesh, making "it the first gay wedding in the Telugu States". Their wedding was attended by family members and close friends. "Our parents weren't initially the most supportive. However, they also didn't disapprove of it either. They decided to give us and themselves a good amount of time to introspect and come to a better conclusion. Now, we have their acceptance.", Chakraborty said. The marriage is not legally recognised. In August 2022, a lesbian couple were married in a traditional Hindu ceremony in Srikalahasti, though the marriage lacks legal recognition. One of the women had previously been married to a man, but after meeting each other they decided to elope. They later asked for police protection in Vempalle.

There have also been marriages of men to transgender women in Andhra Pradesh, including in Tirumala.

Marriages to Shiva
Shiva-shaktis are a hijra community living in Andhra Pradesh. Every autumn during a three-day festival performed across Andhra Pradesh and Telangana, they are married to a sword that represents male power or Shiva, becoming the brides of the sword. One of the avatars of Shiva, a central figure in Hinduism, is Ardhanarishvara, who is depicted as half-man and half-woman, representing Shiva united with his shakti. The shiva-shaktis identify with this form of Shiva and worship at Shiva temples. The religious meaning of the shiva-shakti role is expressed in several Hindu stories, including those of Arjuna, Shiva, Bahuchara Mata and Krishna. Most people in this community belong to lower socio-economic status and live as astrologers, soothsayers, and spiritual healers.

See also
Recognition of same-sex unions in India
Supriyo v. Union Of India

Notes

References

Andhra Pradesh
Politics of Andhra Pradesh